Mike Pont is an American singer, songwriter, and celebrity photographer. As a singer he has sung for several bands, including Hotshot, Trouble, The Mike Pont Band, Danger Danger, and the Gangsters Of Love.

Music
In 1983 Mike Pont co-founded a new wave cover band that would perform throughout the New York Tri-state area. The pre-Danger Danger incarnation of the band Hotshot also featured then future Danger Danger members Bruno Ravel and Steve West. The post-Danger Danger incarnation of Hotshot also featured former Danger Danger guitarist Al Pitrelli.

In 1985 Mike sang backing vocals on the Jack Starr's Burning Starr album Rock the American Way.

After the first incarnation of Hotshot, he went on to form the short lived band Trouble, from which he went on to form The Mike Pont Band. The Mike Pont Band featured guitarist Tony "Bruno" Rey, drummer Chuck Bonfante, and bassist Gary Taylor, all who would go on to be members of the band Saraya.

Next he co-founded the band Danger Danger with Bruno Ravel and Steve West. He was the original lead vocalist of Danger Danger and was replaced in Danger Danger by Ted Poley.

He left Danger Danger and moved to Los Angeles, forming the Gangsters Of Love, and performed as opening act on a few shows for LA Guns on their first tour in 1988.

After leaving Gangsters Of Love, Mike Pont moved back to NY and reformed Hotshot, this time featuring his former Danger Danger bandmate Al Pitrelli, as stated above, and bassist Teddy Cook. In 1989 Pitrelli would leave the band to join Alice Cooper for his Trashes the World tour and Cook to join Ronnie James Dio for his Lock Up the Wolves album and tour.

In 2005 he released the Hotshot CD which features Tony "Bruno" Rey, Al Pitrelli, Bruno Ravel, Steve West, Al Greenwood, Leslie West, Teddy Cook, and a 1990 phone message from Nikki Sixx showing interest in working with Hotshot.

In 2021, inspired by the COVID-19 pandemic, Pont wrote and released the single Goodbye Yesterday. Goodbye Yesterday features bassist Bruno Ravel, guitarists Joey Sykes and Rob Marcello, and original Danger Danger keyboardist Kasey Smith. A video for Goodbye Yesterday, filmed by Noam Galai and Roy Rochlin, was also released.

Photography
Mike Pont is a celebrity photographer.

In 2008 Pont photographed his former band Danger Danger for their 2009 album Revolve.

In 2012 he began photographing celebrities, concerts, and events editorially for Getty Images.

In 2016 he started photographing celebrity portraits, and still photographs, for the online entertainment show BUILD Series, AOL, Yahoo, and Verizon Media.

Discography

With Trouble
 demos

With The Mike Pont Band
 demos

With Danger Danger
 demos

With Hotshot
 demos
 Hotshot (2005)

Mike Pont
 Goodbye Yesterday (2021)

References

External links
Mike Pont website
Hotshot website
Mike Pont Photography website

American male singers
American rock singers
American photographers
People from Queens, New York
Danger Danger members
Living people
Year of birth missing (living people)